Sunflower Dead is an American rock band from California featuring Jamie Teissere of Droid, Michael Del Pizzo, Rob Cisneros of Terror Universal, touring percussionist Jimmy Schultz and Jaboo of Two Hit Creeper. The self-titled album from the band was ranked Album of the Week by Revolver Magazine.

Discography

Studio albums 
 Sunflower Dead (2012)
 It's Time to Get Weird (2015)
 C O M A (2018)
 March of the Leper (2022)

Singles 
 "Wasted" (2014)
 "Dance with Death" (2015) #52 Mainstream Rock Charts
 "It's Time To Get Weird" (2016) #40 Mainstream Rock Charts
 "Victim" (2018) – No. 36 Mainstream Rock Songs
 "Turn Away" (2019) – No. 37 Mainstream Rock Songs

References

External links 

Youtube

Rock music groups from California